A photo album is a series of photographs collected and placed into a book or similar.

Photo album may also refer to:
 Photoalbum (album), a 2001 album by Ivan Král
 The Photo Album, a 2001 album by Death Cab for Cutie
 The Photo Album (Wordsworth album), a 2012 album by Wordsworth
 Photo Album (film), a 2005 video album by Nickelback

See also
Album (disambiguation)